Joshua ben Perahiah or Joshua ben Perachya (Yehoshua Ben Perachia) was Nasi of the Sanhedrin in the latter half of the 2nd century BC.

With Nittai of Arbela, second of five pairs of scholars
He and his colleague Nittai of Arbela were the second of the five pairs (Zugot) of scholars who received and transmitted Jewish tradition.

At the time of the persecution of the Pharisees by John Hyrcanus (c. 134-104 BC), Joshua was deposed — a disgrace to which his words in Menachot 109b apparently allude. However in Sanhedrin 107b and Sotah 47a it was during the persecutions of Pharisees 88-76 BC by Alexander Jannaeus, not John Hyrcanus whose persecution he fled. He fled to Alexandria, Egypt, but was recalled to Jerusalem when the persecutions ceased and the Pharisees again triumphed over the Sadducees.

Teachings and advice
The following ethical maxim found in the Ethics of the Fathers shows his gentle judgment of his fellow men and his eagerness to spread knowledge among the people:

In other traditions he was known in Jewish magical papyri as an exorcist, and his name was used in incantations inscribed on magical bowls.

Yeshu

In another tradition he is also the teacher of Yeshu (in uncensored manuscripts of the Talmud), where he and Yeshu flee to Egypt. In other manuscripts his student is Judah ben Tabbai. The account as it appears in the Talmud is as follows:

Dunn (1992) considers this to be a story of Jesus from the late Amoraic period, which contains old polemical elements that were already current in New Testament times. His story is parallel to that of Elisha and Gehazi. However: Gustaf Dalman, Joachim Jeremias (1935, 1960), and others do not consider the Yeshu mentioned as Joshua's pupil to be Jesus.

References

2nd-century BC clergy
2nd-century BCE rabbis
Pirkei Avot rabbis
Talmud rabbis of the Land of Israel
Zugot
Sanhedrin